KAYO is a Classic Country formatted broadcast radio station licensed to Wasilla, Alaska, serving the Mat-Su Valley.  KAYO is owned and operated by Alpha Media LLC.  Its studios are located in Anchorage (two blocks west of Dimond Center), and its transmitter is in Lazy Mountain, Alaska.

External links
Country Legends 100.9 Online

AYO
Radio stations established in 2009
Alpha Media radio stations
2009 establishments in Alaska